The 2018 Australian Open described in detail, in the form of day-by-day summaries.

Day 1 (15 January)
 Seeds out:
 Men's Singles:  Jack Sock [8],  Kevin Anderson [11],  John Isner [16],  Lucas Pouille [18],  Philipp Kohlschreiber [27]
 Women's Singles:  Venus Williams [5],  CoCo Vandeweghe [10],  Sloane Stephens [13],  Dominika Cibulková [24],  Peng Shuai [25],  Ekaterina Makarova [31]
 Schedule of Play

Day 2 (16 January)
 Seeds out:
 Men's Singles:  Roberto Bautista Agut [20],  Milos Raonic [22],  Mischa Zverev [32]
 Women's Singles:  Kristina Mladenovic [11],  Petra Kvitová [27]
 Schedule of Play

Day 3 (17 January) 
 15 year old Marta Kostyuk become the youngest player to reach a grand slam third round since Mirjana Lučić-Baroni at the 1997 US Open. 

 The second round match between Daria Gavrilova and Elise Mertens began at 11.59pm became the latest match to begin at in Australian Open history. This surpassing the previous record of 11.58pm set by Grigor Dimitrov and Richard Gasquet in 2017.  

 Seeds out:
 Men's Singles:  Pablo Cuevas [31]
 Women's Singles:  Julia Görges [12],  Anastasia Pavlyuchenkova [15],  Daria Kasatkina [22],  Daria Gavrilova [23]
 Men's Doubles:   Santiago González /  Julio Peralta [13],  Ivan Dodig /  Fernando Verdasco [14]
 Women's Doubles:  Andreja Klepač /  María José Martínez Sánchez [9]
 Schedule of Play

Day 4 (18 January)
 Seeds out:
 Men's Singles:  David Goffin [7],  Stan Wawrinka [9],  Sam Querrey [13]
 Women's Singles:  Garbiñe Muguruza [3],  Johanna Konta [9],  Anastasija Sevastova [14],  Elena Vesnina [16],  Mirjana Lučić-Baroni [28]
 Men's Doubles:  Raven Klaasen /  Michael Venus [8],  Pablo Cuevas /  Horacio Zeballos [12]
 Women's Doubles:  Kiki Bertens /  Johanna Larsson [7]
 Schedule of Play

Day 5 (19 January)
 Seeds out:
 Men's Singles:  Jo-Wilfried Tsonga [15],  Gilles Müller [23],  Damir Džumhur [28],  Andrey Rublev [30]
 Women's Singles:  Jeļena Ostapenko [7],  Kiki Bertens [30]
 Men's Doubles:  Henri Kontinen /  John Peers [2],  Feliciano López /  Marc López [9]
 Schedule of Play

Day 6 (20 January)
 The Simona Halep/Lauren Davis match lasted three hours and 45 minutes, equalling the Australian Open's record for most games played in a women's match at 48. The 142-minute third set lasted longer than all but six female singles matches to date in the tournament.
 Chung Hyeon became the first South Korean player (male or female) to reach the fourth round at the Grand Slam.
 Seeds out:
 Men's Singles:  Alexander Zverev [4],  Juan Martín del Potro [12],  Albert Ramos Viñolas [21],  Adrian Mannarino [26],  Richard Gasquet [29]
 Women's Singles:  Ashleigh Barty [18],  Agnieszka Radwańska [26],  Lucie Šafářová [29]
 Men's Doubles:  Jean-Julien Rojer /  Horia Tecău [3],  Pierre-Hugues Herbert /  Nicolas Mahut [4],  Jamie Murray /  Bruno Soares [5]
 Women's Doubles:  Ashleigh Barty /  Casey Dellacqua [3],  Alicja Rosolska /  Abigail Spears [15]
 Schedule of Play

Day 7 (21 January)
 Seeds out:
 Men's Singles:  Pablo Carreño Busta [10],  Nick Kyrgios [17],  Diego Schwartzman [24]
 Women's Singles:  Magdaléna Rybáriková [19],  Anett Kontaveit [32]
 Women's Doubles:  Raquel Atawo /  Anna-Lena Grönefeld [12],  Nicole Melichar /  Květa Peschke [13]
 Schedule of Play

Day 8 (22 January)
 Seeds out:
 Men's Singles:  Dominic Thiem [5],  Novak Djokovic [14],  Fabio Fognini [25]
 Women's Singles:  Caroline Garcia [8],  Barbora Strýcová [20]
 Men's Doubles:  Rohan Bopanna /  Édouard Roger-Vasselin [10],  Rajeev Ram /  Divij Sharan [16]
 Women's Doubles:  Shuko Aoyama /  Yang Zhaoxuan [11],  Chan Hao-ching /  Katarina Srebotnik [14],  Barbora Krejčíková /  Kateřina Siniaková [16]
 Mixed Doubles:  Latisha Chan /  Jamie Murray [1],  Casey Dellacqua /  John Peers [2],  Květa Peschke /  Henri Kontinen [4]
 Schedule of Play

Day 9 (23 January)
 Seeds out:
 Men's Singles:  Rafael Nadal [1],  Grigor Dimitrov [3]
 Women's Singles:  Elina Svitolina [4]
 Men's Doubles:  Łukasz Kubot /  Marcelo Melo [1],  Marcin Matkowski /  Aisam-ul-Haq Qureshi [15]
 Women's Doubles:  Latisha Chan /  Andrea Sestini Hlaváčková [1],  Lucie Šafářová /  Barbora Strýcová [4],  Gabriela Dabrowski /  Xu Yifan [6]
 Mixed Doubles:  Chan Hao-ching /  Michael Venus [7]
 Schedule of Play

Day 10 (24 January)
 Seeds out:
 Men's Singles: Tomáš Berdych [19]
 Women's Singles:  Karolína Plíšková [6],  Madison Keys [17]
 Women's Doubles:  Hsieh Su-wei /  Peng Shuai [8],  Irina-Camelia Begu /  Monica Niculescu [10]
 Schedule of Play

Day 11 (25 January)
 Seeds out:
 Women's Singles:  Angelique Kerber [21]
 Men's Doubles:  Bob Bryan /  Mike Bryan [6]
 Mixed Doubles:  Andrea Sestini Hlaváčková /  Édouard Roger-Vasselin [6]
 Schedule of Play

Day 12 (26 January)
 Seeds out:
 Women's Doubles:  Ekaterina Makarova /  Elena Vesnina [2]
 Mixed Doubles:  Ekaterina Makarova /  Bruno Soares [3]
 Schedule of Play

Day 13 (27 January)
 Caroline Wozniacki became the first Danish player to win a Grand Slam singles title.
 Seeds out:
 Women's Singles:  Simona Halep [1]
 Men's Doubles:  Juan Sebastián Cabal /  Robert Farah [11]
 Schedule of Play

Day 14 (28 January)
 Seeds out:
 Men's Singles:  Marin Čilić [6]
 Mixed Doubles:  Tímea Babos /  Rohan Bopanna [5] 
 Schedule of Play

References

Day-by-day summaries
Australian Open (tennis) by year – Day-by-day summaries